Geldkarte is a stored-value card or electronic cash system used in Germany. It operates as an offline smart card for small payment at things like vending machines and to pay for public transport or parking tickets.  The card is pre-paid and funds are loaded onto the card using ATMs or dedicated charging machines. The system will be abandoned from 2024.

History 

The first field trial took place in 1996 in Ravensburg. 

Since 1 January 2007, the card can be used for the mandatory age verification at German cigarette vending machines. This caused a steep use of the Geldkarte system, which suffered from very low demand in its first ten years. As of 2009, 132 million Euros were spent through the Geldkarte system. The average transaction had a value of €3, however usage numbers were already decreasing again. 

In 2015, Deutsche Post removed Geldkarte acceptance from their stamp vending machines citing low demand.

As of 2018, less than 1 percent of all issued cards with Geldkarte functionality were being used.

As of 2020, both Geldkarte and its contactless counterpart girogo are in the process of being phased-out with new cards no longer being issued due to decreased demand. The system will be shut down by 2024 when all remaining cards have been replaced by Girocards with contactless payment function.

See also 
 Chipknip
 FeliCa
 Octopus card
 Moneo

References 

Smart cards
Stored-value payment card